Didier Camberabero (born 9 January 1961), is a former French international rugby union player. He played as fly half.

Biography
Camberabero is a son of the former international, Guy Camberabero, and the nephew of Lilian Camberabero, two brothers who took part in the first Grand Slam won by France. His brother, Gilles, is also an outstanding rugby player.

Didier is the third highest point scorer for the French international team, with 354 points in 36 tests match, behind Christophe Lamaison (380 pts in 37 tests) and Thierry Lacroix (367 points in 43 tests).

Didier also previously set a world record for the greatest number of points on only one match in team of France: 30, against Zimbabwe in 1987.  This still stands as a French national record, although the world record has now been surpassed by Simon Culhane (45 points, against Japan in 1995).

With his father Guy, Didier is tied the French record of the number of successful conversions  on a match: 9 in 1987, against Zimbabwe.

He held the world record for the number of successful drop goals in a single match, 3 in 1990 until Jannie De Beer of South Africa broke this when he kicked 5 against England in the 1999 Rugby World Cup quarter final.

Camberabero felt the intrusion of the Cold War in the 1984 FIRA Championships.  As a member of the French armed forces, the Polish rugby body tried to prevent him playing , along with Henri Sanz and the Brive RFC centre Yves Fouget, because they were supposed to constitute a security risk to the Communist Regime.

Statistics

 36 caps for France, between 1982 and 1991
 Played in the final of the Rugby World Cup in 1987
 Winner of the Five Nations tournament in 1983

References

Sources

 Cotton, Fran (Ed.) (1984) The Book of Rugby Disasters & Bizarre Records. Compiled by Chris Rhys. London. Century Publishing. 

1961 births
Living people
Sportspeople from Valence, Drôme
French rugby union players
Rugby union fly-halves
France international rugby union players
AS Béziers Hérault players
FC Grenoble players
USA Perpignan players